Still is the sixth studio album by American R&B group SWV. It was released on February 5, 2016, through Mass Appeal Entertainment and eOne Music. The album was preceded by the release of the singles, "Ain't No Man", "MCE (Man Crush Everyday)", and "On Tonight".

Still peaked at number 80 on the US Billboard 200 albums chart, number five on the US R&B Albums chart and number 11 on the Top R&B/Hip-Hop Albums chart with sales of 10,000 in its first week.

Background and composition
Still is SWV's first album release in four years, following 2012's I Missed Us with a 10 track set, with 10 original songs. All songs written and produced by Cainon Lamb and Derrick "Bigg D" Baker along with co-writers Sean McMillion, Ralph Jeanty, Taurian Osborne, Ayanna Howard, Samuel "Sam Hook" Jean, Patrice Rushen, Fred Washington, Steven "Q-Beatz" Kubie, Tami Latrell, Dennis Lambert, Brian Potter,  Marcus Henderson, Cortni Elisa Jordan, Shonie Osumanu, Dashon J. Vincent, Leon Huff, Kenneth Gamble and August Rigo.

On the Target edition of "Still", it has 3 additional live bonus tracks added to the track listing, including their biggest hits "Right Here", "I'm So into You" and "Weak".

Singles
"Ain't No Man" was released as the album's lead single on August 7, 2015. The music video for "Ain't No Man" was released on VEVO on October 3, 2015 directed by Derek Blanks.

"MCE (Man Crush Everyday)" was released as the album's second single on December 15, 2015. Fans got "MCE (Man Crush Everyday)" instantly once the album was available for pre-order.

"On Tonight" was released as the third single on January 22, 2016. The song samples Patrice Rushen's single "Never Gonna Give You Up".

Critical reception

Still received mixed reviews from music critics. AllMusic gave a mixed response to the album "A fair portion of Still, released almost four years [after the group's previous album], doesn't have those qualities in its favor, and the level of song quality isn't quite as high." "MCE (Man Crush Everyday)," a sparkling slow jam, is among SWV's best, while the throwback ballad "When Love Didn't Hurt" and relatively contemporary "Miss You" are close behind it. Other songs are more likely to make a listener think of SWV's catalog or songs by other artists. "Had this been SWV's 2010s return, it would have been adequate, but it's a lengthy backward stride from I Missed Us."
SoulTracks gave a mixed response to the album "The cover displays three close and confident women, glammed up to the gods and hitting their strides as individuals and artists. What isn't so apparent, however, is the breakneck speed in which the music came together—one whole week. Conceived to coincide with the heightened profile of the previous reality show, Still follows the arc of their 2012 release, except there's more lead vocal sharing this time around. Taj's throaty contributions are the most distinctive of the two, prominent on the come-hither mid-tempo, "Let's Make Music," and the roller-skate-ready groove "On Tonight." LeLee's is more subdued in tone, but just as affecting on  the nostalgic bluesy turn of a ballad, "When Love Didn't Hurt."

Commercial performance
Still debuted at number 80 on the US Billboard 200, number 5 on the Billboard R&B Albums Chart  and number 11 on the Top R&B/Hip-Hop Albums chart with first week sales of 10,000 units.

Live performances
SWV performed a medley of their songs "I'm So into You", "Ain't No Man" and "Weak" on the daytime talk show The View on December 12, 2015. SWV performed "Ain't No Man" in a concert at The Classic Weekend Show in Birmingham Alabama, on October 30, 2015. "MCE (Man Crush Everyday)" was performed at BB Kings, New York on January 21, 2016.

Track listing

Personnel
Credits adapted from AllMusic.com

Performers and musicians
Cheryl "Coko" Clemons – vocals, background vocals
Tamara "Taj" Johnson-George – vocals, background vocals
Leanne "Lelee" Lyons – vocals, background vocals

Technical

Derrick "Bigg D" Baker – executive producer
Cainon Lamb –	executive producer
Cheryl Clemons – executive producer
Tamara Johnson – executive producer
Leanne Lyons – executive producer
Marcus Siskind "DL" – executive producer
Michael Clemons – vocal producer, vocals
Steven "Q-Beatz" Kubie – engineer
Isabel Evans – A&R
Danielle Brimm – A&R
Derek Blanks – art direction, design, photography
Marquis Bridges – additional production
Kevin "KD" Davis – mixing
Chris Gehringer – mastering
Florian "Flo" Ongonga – engineer
Clinton Sparks – additional production
Julia Sutowski – coordinating producer
Ariel Zucco – 	assistant engineer

Charts

References

2016 albums
SWV albums
E1 Music albums